Three ships of the Royal Navy have been named HMS Nubian after the people of Nubia.

  was a  destroyer. Her bows were blown off in 1916, and her mid and aft sections were combined with the bows of the damaged destroyer , the resulting vessel being named "". 
 , launched 1937, was a destroyer of another .

Royal Navy ship names